Sons of the P is the second album by American rap group Digital Underground, released in 1991. The album contained two hit singles, "No Nose Job" and "Kiss You Back," both of which were written by and featured the lead vocals of Greg Jacobs (a.k.a. Shock G/Humpty Hump). The latter featured multi-layered choruses and background vocals sung by Boni Boyer, who briefly worked with D.U. shortly after her stint with Prince's Sign of the Times/Love Sexy band.

It is sometimes mistakenly reported that "Kiss You Back" was co-written and co-performed by George Clinton,  but his name appropriately appears in the songwriting credits due to a sample of "(Not Just) Knee Deep," by Funkadelic. He did actively participate in the writing and recording of the title track, to which he also contributed vocals, and which marked one of the earliest studio guest appearances by Clinton on a hip hop release, preceded only by Kurtis Blow's "Magilla Gorilla," released in 1986.

Both the album and the single "Kiss You Back" were certified Gold by the RIAA.

Track listing
"The DFLO Shuffle" feat. 2Pac
"Heartbeat Props"
"No Nose Job"
"Sons Of The P" (features George Clinton)
"Flowin' On The D-Line"
"Kiss You Back"
"Tales Of The Funky"
"The Higher Heights Of Spirituality"
"Family Of The Underground" (features Stretch)
"The D-Flowstrumental" (CD Only Track)
"Good Thing We're Rappin'"

Samples
"Heartbeat Props" - samples "Freak of the Week" (from the LP Uncle Jam Wants You by Funkadelic)
"Kiss You Back" - samples "(Not Just) Knee Deep" (from the LP Uncle Jam Wants You by Funkadelic)
"Flowin' on the D-Line" - samples "Impeach the President" by The Honey Drippers
"Good Thing We're Rappin'" - samples "Papa Was Too" by Joe Tex
"Tales of the Funky" - samples "One Nation Under a Groove" by Funkadelic & "Mothership Connection (Star Child)" by Parliament
"The DFLO Shuffle" - samples "Long Red" (from the album Mountain Live: The Road Goes Ever On by Mountain)
"No Nose Job" - samples "I Wish" (from the album Songs in the Key of Life by Stevie Wonder)
"Family of the Underground" - samples "Family Affair" (from the album There's a Riot Goin' On by Sly and The Family Stone)

Album chart positions

Weekly charts

Year-end charts

Singles chart positions

Certifications

References

1991 albums
Digital Underground albums
Tupac Shakur
Tommy Boy Records albums
T.N.T. Recording albums